Huang Xuan (born 3 March 1985) is a Chinese actor. He is best known for his roles in Blind Massage (2014), The Legend of Mi Yue (2015), The Interpreter (2016) and Extraordinary Mission (2017).

Life and career
Born and raised in Lanzhou, Gansu, China, Huang graduated from Beijing Dance Academy in 2008. He made his film debut in The Shaft the same year. Among his notable projects in earlier years were The Dream of Red Mansions and Driverless.

Huang rose to fame in 2014 with his performance in the television series Red Sorghum and film Blind Massage, and was awarded the Rising Actor award at the China TV Drama Awards. He also played supporting roles in The Golden Era directed by Ann Hui; as well as music film Blue Sky Bones directed by Cui Jian; where he received praise for both his performances.
In 2015, Huang starred in historical drama The Legend of Mi Yue and earned the title of "People's First Love" for his role as Huang Xie.

In 2016, he won the Best Actor award at the Hengdian Film and TV Festival of China for his role as Zhu Qiyu in the historical-medical drama The Imperial Doctress. The same year, he starred in The Interpreter, which became the highest rated drama of the year.

In 2017, he starred in the crime thriller film Extraordinary Mission directed by  Alan Mak. He won the Best Action Movie New Performer award at the Jackie Chan Action Movie Awards for his performance in the film. The same year, Huang starred in the fantasy drama Tribes and Empires: Storm of Prophecy by Jin Hezai, set in the fictional universe of Novoland. He was also cast as the male lead in Youth, a coming-of-age film directed by Feng Xiaogang; and starred in Chen Kaige's fantasy mystery film Legend of the Demon Cat. 

In 2018, Huang was cast in Cao Baoping's upcoming film The Perfect Blue, alongside Fan Bingbing. The same year, he starred in the modern workplace drama  Entrepreneurial Age. 

In 2019, Huang starred in the spy action drama Sniper directed by Guo Shubo and Bie Ke. The same year he starred in romance film Only Clouds Know directed by Feng Xiaogang.

Opposition to criticism of human rights in China
In 2021, Huang terminated his endorsement contract with the clothing manufacturer H&M  after it criticized China for human rights violations against Uyghurs in the Xinjiang region of China where cotton for clothing products is grown.

Filmography

Film

Television series

Television show

Discography

Awards and nominations

Forbes China Celebrity 100

References

External links

1985 births
Living people
People from Lanzhou
21st-century Chinese male actors
Chinese male film actors
Chinese male television actors
Male actors from Gansu
Male actors from Beijing
Beijing Dance Academy alumni